Notable people named Anne (or Ann) Lennox include:

Anne Lennox, Duchess of Richmond (1671-1722)
Anne van Keppel, Countess of Albemarle (1703-1789), born Anne Lennox
Lady Anne Lennox (1726–1727), infant daughter of Charles Lennox, 2nd Duke of Richmond, and his wife Sarah
Annie Lennox (born 1954), Scottish singer